Mghart (also romanized as Mgart) is a town in the Lori Province of Armenia. As of 2001, it has a population of 523.

References 

Populated places in Lori Province